Roberto Neves Adam Júnior (born 29 June 1989), simply known as Juninho is a Brazilian professional footballer who played for Ethnikos Achna in Cyprus.

References

External links 
 
 

1989 births
Living people
Association football midfielders
Brazilian footballers
Brazilian expatriate footballers
Montevideo Wanderers F.C. players
Plaza Colonia players
Uruguayan Primera División players
Grêmio Esportivo Brasil players
Foolad FC players
C.A. Cerro players
Villa Teresa players
Ethnikos Achna FC players
Cypriot First Division players
Expatriate footballers in Uruguay
Expatriate footballers in Cyprus
Panegialios F.C. players